In mathematics, S-space is a regular topological space that is hereditarily separable but is not a Lindelöf space. L-space is a regular topological space that is hereditarily Lindelöf but not separable.  A space is separable if it has a countable dense set and hereditarily separable if every subspace is separable.

It had been believed for a long time that S-space problem and L-space problem are dual, i.e. if there is an S-space in some model of set theory then there is an L-space in the same model and vice versa – which is not true.

It was shown in the early 1980s that the existence of S-space is independent of the usual axioms of ZFC. This means that to prove the existence of an S-space or to prove the non-existence of S-space, we need to assume axioms beyond those of ZFC. The L-space problem (whether an L-space can exist without assuming additional set-theoretic assumptions beyond those of ZFC) was not resolved until recently.

Todorcevic proved that under  PFA there are no S-spaces. This means that every regular  hereditarily separable space is Lindelöf. For some time, it was believed the L-space problem would have a similar solution (that its existence would be independent of ZFC). 
Todorcevic showed that there is a model of set theory with Martin's axiom where there is an L-space but there are no S-spaces. Further, Todorcevic found a compact S-space from a Cohen real.

In 2005, Moore solved the L-space problem by constructing an L-space without assuming additional axioms and by combining Todorcevic's rho functions with number theory.

Sources
 K. P. Hart, Juniti Nagata, J.E. Vaughan: Encyclopedia of General Topology, Elsevier, 2003 , 
 Stevo Todorcevic: "Partition problems in topology" (Chapter 2, 5, 6, and 9), Contemporary Mathematics, 1989: Volume 84 ,  
 Justin Tatch Moore: "A Solution to the L Space Problem", Journal of the American Mathematical Society, Volume 19, pages 717–736, 2006

General topology
Topological spaces